Carlos Prieto (born 2 February 1980 in Mérida, Spain) is a Spanish handball player. From 2013 play for the German Bundesliga club HSG Wetzlar.

He participated at the 2008 summer Olympics in Beijing as a member of the Spain men's national handball team. The team won a bronze medal, defeating Croatia and he scored 7 goals being one of the best players. He is currently playing for the German side HSG Wetzlar.

References
The Official Website of the Beijing 2008 Olympic Games

Spanish male handball players
FC Barcelona Handbol players
Spanish expatriate sportspeople in Germany
Handball players at the 2008 Summer Olympics
Olympic handball players of Spain
Olympic bronze medalists for Spain
1980 births
Living people
BM Ciudad Real players
BM Valladolid players
HSG Wetzlar players
Olympic medalists in handball
Medalists at the 2008 Summer Olympics
21st-century Spanish people